This is the discography of American rapper Webbie.

Albums

Studio albums

Collaboration albums

Mixtapes

Singles

As lead artist

As featured artist

Other charted songs

Music videos

Notes 

A  "Bad Bitch" did not enter the Billboard Hot 100, but peaked at number 20 on the Bubbling Under Hot 100 Singles chart, which acts somewhat as a 25-song extension to the Hot 100.
B  "My People" did not enter the Hot R&B/Hip-Hop Songs chart, but peaked at number 15 on the Bubbling Under R&B/Hip-Hop Singles chart, which acts somewhat as a 25-song extension to the R&B/Hip-Hop Songs chart.
C  "What Is It" did not enter the Hot R&B/Hip-Hop Songs chart, but peaked at number 9 on the Bubbling Under R&B/Hip-Hop Singles chart, which acts somewhat as a 25-song extension to the R&B/Hip-Hop Songs chart.
D  "Pop It 4 Pimp" did not enter the Hot R&B/Hip-Hop Songs chart, but peaked at number 15 on the Bubbling Under R&B/Hip-Hop Singles chart, which acts somewhat as a 25-song extension to the R&B/Hip-Hop Songs chart.
E  "I Don't Love Her" did not enter the Hot R&B/Hip-Hop Songs chart, but peaked at number 2 on the Bubbling Under R&B/Hip-Hop Singles chart, which acts somewhat as a 25-song extension to the R&B/Hip-Hop Songs chart.

References 

Hip hop discographies
Discographies of American artists